The men's team tournament of the 2016 World Team Table Tennis Championships was held from 28 February to 6 March 2016.

All times are local (UTC+8)

Championship division
The top three teams of each group advanced.

Preliminary round

Group A

Group B

Group C

Group D

Knockout stage
The group winners of Groupd C and D were drawn, as well as the second and third placed teams. Same for the fourth, fifth and sixth placed teams.

Places 13–24

Places 1–12

Round of 16

Quarterfinals

Semifinals

Final

Division 2

Preliminary round

Group E

Group F

Group G

Group H

Knockout stage
The group winners, as well as the second and third placed teams were drawn. Same for the fourth, fifth and sixth placed teams.

Places 37–48

Places 25–36

Division 3

Preliminary round

Group I

Group J

Group K

Group L

Knockout stage
The group winners,  the second and third placed teams were drawn. Same for the fourth, fifth and sixth placed teams.

Places 61–72

69th place bracket

Places 49–60

57th place bracket

Division 4

Preliminary round

Group M

Group N

Group O

Group P

Knockout stage

Places 73–80

77th place bracket

Places 81–88

85th place bracket

References

External links
Official website

Men's team